Stadionul CMC, also known as Stadionul TCI, is a multi-use stadium in Cluj-Napoca, Romania. It is used mostly for football matches and is the home ground of CFR Cluj Academy. The stadium holds 3,000 people and is also used for CFR Cluj's youth center squads matches and trainings.

References

External links
 Stadionul CMC at Soccerway

Football venues in Romania
Buildings and structures in Cluj-Napoca
Sport in Cluj-Napoca